Cime di Val Loga is a mountain of Lombardy, Italy.

Mountains of the Alps
Alpine three-thousanders
Mountains of Lombardy